The Bratislava Tennis Exhibition 2011 was a one-off women's exhibition tennis tournament, held on 21 November, featuring two of the best ranked women and men's legends. It was held at the Sibamac Arena in Bratislava, Slovakia.

Matches

References

Tennis tournaments in Slovakia
2011 tennis exhibitions
2011 in Slovak women's sport
Sports competitions in Bratislava
2010s in Bratislava
November 2011 sports events in Europe
2011 in Slovak tennis